Fabrice is a French masculine given name from the Roman name Fabricius, which is itself derived from the Latin faber meaning blacksmith or craftsman. Notable people with the name include:

 Fabrice Balanche (born 1969), French geographer
 Fabrice Bellard, French computer programmer who founded FFmpeg
 Fabrice Benichou (born 1965), French boxer
 Fabrice Bry (born 1972), French volleyball player
 Fabrice Colin (born 1972), French writer
 Fabrice Du Welz (born 1972), Belgian film director 
 Fabrice Mazliah (born 1972), Swiss Dancer and Choreographer
 Fabrice Ehret (born 1979), Swiss-born French footballer
 Fabrice Guy (born 1968), French Nordic combined skier
 Fabrice Lhomme (born 1965), French investigative journalist
 Fabrice Lokembo-Lokaso (born 1982), Congolese footballer
 Fabrice Luchini (born 1951), French actor
 Fabrice Martin (born 1986), French tennis player
 Fabrice Morvan (born 1966), French singer
 Fabrice Muamba (born 1988), Congolose-British footballer
 Fabrice Noël (born 1985), Haitian footballer
 Fabrice Olinga (born 1996), Cameroonian footballer
 Fabrice Santoro (born 1972), French tennis player
 Fabrice Simon (1951–1998), Haitian-American fashion designer
 Fabrice Tiozzo (born 1969), French boxer

French masculine given names